Malmal Village is a village in India, situated about 560 mi (or 902 km) east of New Delhi, the country's capital. It is situated 3 km from Kaluahi and approximately 17 km from Madhubani in the Indian state of Bihar.

Malmal is one of the largest of the 1,111 villages in Madhubani district. It has two Panchayats: North Malmal Village and South Malmal Village.

Demographics 
The population of the village is 21,153. The literacy rate is 87%, with a male literacy rate at 89.96% and a female literacy rate at 68.15%.

History

Malmal was established by Malmali Khan during the time of Akbar. Malmali Khan was one of the translators in Akabari darbar. After the establishment of New Raj Darbhanga, several expansions took place to develop the tax system in the Mithila region. Raj Darbhanga had 4,495 villages in 18 circles in Bihar and Bengal and employed over 8,000 officers to manage the estate.

Geography

The nearest villages are:West: Champa, Naraila, Belauniya (known as Belauna) East: Bardepur, Pursolia North: Rarh South: Mohammed Pur (Kaluahi). Qazitola (haripur).

Education

Malmal schools offer both Islamic and modern education. Notable Islamic colleges and madrasa, are based there.

One of the biggest and oldest Madrasas is Madrasa Chashma-e Faiz, founded by Abdul bari Machhli Shahri. It was established in 1815–1820 and is now one of the branches of Darul Uloom Nadwatul Ulama, Lucknow. Madrasa Chasm-e-Faiz provides Islamic and modern studies. Talim-ul-Quran was established in 1900 by Amanat Ali marhum muhallah shumali. It has a beautiful Mosque in front of it.

Several government and private schools exist for modern education. One notable modern school is Safa Girl's High School which was established in 1992 and provides education for females up to tenth grade. In addition, male students may enroll up to fifth grade..

Religion and caste 

The two predominant religions in Malmal are Islam and Hindu. The various castes, called jāti, are bound by traditions regarding interaction and intermarriage.

Economy

The standard of living is similar to that of the northern Bihar region. Many residents are educated and work in global corporations. Many large and medium-size businesses offer good incomes. The standard of housing, and food quality and availability, is better than in nearby villages. Many middle-class residents have houses made of cement or concrete. There are roads and electricity and many branded shops.

Culture 
Vegetables and fish are the primary elements of the local diet.

Hindu residents wear Dhoti and kurta, while Muslims wear kurta, pyjama and topi.

Cultural events include mushaira, baitbazi, quizzes, panel discussions, theater performances, etc. Many festivals are celebrated by Hindus such as Durga Puja, Kali Puja, Saraswati Puja, Chhatt, Deepawali, and Holi. Muslims celebrate Eid-ul-Fitr and Eid-ul-azha, and Ramadan.

Sports
Sports facilities are minimal, although cricket, badminton, carrom Boards swimming, marathon, kabaddi, and kho kho, are becoming more popular. In 1984 one Tanzeem, Eslah-e-moashra was established. This club participated in a cricket tournament and awarded the "Discipline Cup" due to the extraordinary discipline of players.

Two more social groups for youth were established during 1989–90 in Malmal called "Barg-e-Nau" and "Subh-e-Nau". Under them are several inter-village levels of sports competition that elevated sports culture. The main events were swimming, marathon and its variants (frog race, jalebi race, etc.) and cycling.

References

 

Villages in Madhubani district